WDEM-CD (channel 17) is a low-power Class A television station in Columbus, Ohio, United States. The station is owned by Innovate Corp. and mostly broadcasts subchannels featuring infomercials and diginets.

History
W17AI began broadcasting in 1987. It was owned by Regional Broadcasting Corporation, owned by Gary and Susan Clarke; beginning in 1988, it primarily served to rebroadcast WWAT-TV in Chillicothe. At the time, WWAT-TV had been removed from all three of the cable systems in the Columbus area. This was a change from Clarke's original plan for programming W17AI after he purchased the permit from the LaMarca Group of New York City the year before; he had originally intended on programming oriented to the large campus audience at Ohio State University. The Clarkes sold the station in August 1989 to WWAT-TV owner Wendell A. Triplett. In 1991, W17AI split from WWAT-TV to broadcast the Home Shopping Network. The call sign was changed to WDEM-LP in 1998.

In early 2009, the station—still owned by Triplett—changed its programming from home shopping to an arts and culture format known as "Lifeline Columbus" under the leadership of David Chesnet. The station had previously become a Class A station in December 2008, changing call signs from WDEM-CA to WDEM-CD. The station also converted to digital in 2009 and added a subchannel airing Telemundo in 2010. Subchannels aired in the 2010s included Universal Sports and Justice Network (now True Crime Network). Minority Brands, owned by Richard Schilg, acquired WDEM-CD from Triplett for $75,000 in 2014.

On April 3, 2019, HC2 Holdings closed on its acquisition of WDEM from Minority Brands, Inc., for $866,000. The station then moved from channel 17 to channel 24 as part of the repack, with Telemundo replaced by HC2-owned Azteca América.

Technical information

Subchannels
The station's digital signal is multiplexed:

References

Television channels and stations established in 1986
DEM-CD
Low-power television stations in the United States
Innovate Corp.
LX (TV network) affiliates
Defy TV affiliates
TrueReal affiliates